Salmas (electoral district) is the 8th electoral district in the West Azerbaijan Province of Iran. It has a population of 192,591 and elects 1 member of parliament.

1980
MP in 1980 from the electorate of Salmas. (1st)
 Mohammad Ghaffari

1984
MP in 1984 from the electorate of Salmas. (2nd)
 Ghasem Mehrzad-Sadaghiani

1988
MP in 1988 from the electorate of Salmas. (3rd)
 Ghasem Mehrzad-Sadaghiani

1992
MP in 1992 from the electorate of Salmas. (4th)
 Fathollah Rezaei

1996
MP in 1996 from the electorate of Salmas. (5th)
 Ghasem Mehrzad-Sadaghiani

2000
MP in 2000 from the electorate of Salmas. (6th)
 Aliakbar Aghaei Moghanjoei

2004
MP in 2004 from the electorate of Salmas. (7th)
 Aliakbar Aghaei Moghanjoei

2008
MP in 2008 from the electorate of Salmas. (8th)
 Aliakbar Aghaei Moghanjoei

2012
MP in 2012 from the electorate of Salmas. (9th)
 Aliakbar Aghaei Moghanjoei

2016

Notes

References

Electoral districts of West Azerbaijan
Salmas County
Deputies of Salmas